Now and Always: 20 Years of Dreaming is a compilation album by English recording artist Gabrielle. It was released on 18 November 2013 through Island Records to coincide with the release of her debut single, "Dreams", twenty years ago. Conceived after a lengthy break, during which Gabrielle had considered retirement, she worked with several new collaborators on the new material on the album, including producers Jake Isaac, Sonny J. Mason, Naughty Boy, Syience as well as J. Hirst and J. Dunne and songwriter Emeli Sandé.

The album consists of 34 tracks, including most of Gabrielle's singles, a number of album tracks, remixes from her remix album Rise Underground, and seven brand new tracks. Naughty Boy's reworking of "Dreams" was made available on iTunes ahead of the album's release, with options to purchase it either as a standalone track or to receive it as an immediate download when pre-ordering the album, while "Say Goodbye" was released as a digital-only single on the same day as the album. The album debuted and peaked at number 38 on the UK Albums Chart.

Track listing

Notes
 signifies co-producer
 signifies additional producer

Charts

Certifications

References

External links
 Gabrielle.co.uk – official website

2013 compilation albums
Gabrielle (singer) albums
Albums produced by Richard Stannard (songwriter)